Thomas Alfred Francis Kapielski (born 1951) is a German author, literary critic, visual artist and musician.  He was the winner of the 2011 Kassel Literary Prize and the 2010 Preis der Literaturhäuser.

References

1951 births
Living people

German male writers